Lanyon is an unincorporated community in Lost Grove Township in Webster County, Iowa.

Geography 
It is located 17 miles south of the county seat of Fort Dodge, 2.65 miles south and one mile west of Harcourt (on U.S. Route 169), and 3.3 miles north and 4.5 miles west of Boxholm. Lanyon consists of seven blocks, bounded on the north by 390th Street, and on the east by Lanyon Avenue.

Lanyon's elevation is 1,171 feet (357 m).

History
The community was founded by Swedish emigrants, part of a migration from Knox County, Illinois in the 1860s.

It is located on the diagonal route of a former interurban railroad between Boone and Rockwell City, which was used by the Fort Dodge, Des Moines and Southern Railroad until the 1960s. A station at Layton was opened in 1899 to serve a railway laid that year by the Marshalltown and Dakota Railroad Company to carry coal mined near Fraser northwest to connections at Gowrie. A Lanyon Post Office was established in 1900, the Lanyon Mutual Telephone Company was established in 1903, and the Bank of Lanyon, Lanyon Well Company, and (until the early 1960s) Lanyon Consolidated School. Lanyon is now within the Prairie Valley Community School District.

It includes the Evangelical Covenant Church, founded in 1877 and located in Lanyon since 1909.

Notable people
George E. Q. Johnson, United States attorney for the U.S. District Court for the Northern District of Illinois who successfully prosecuted Al Capone for tax evasion
 Jon Lindgren, mayor of Fargo, North Dakota from 1978 to 1994; second longest-serving mayor of Fargo.
 Obed Simon Johnson, the first westerner to become aware of the ancient Chinese alchemist and author of "A Study of Chinese Alchemy".

References

Unincorporated communities in Webster County, Iowa
Unincorporated communities in Iowa
Populated places established in the 1860s
Swedish-American history
Swedish-American culture in Iowa
1860s establishments in Iowa